Stephanomeria fluminea is a species of flowering plant in the family Asteraceae known by the common names Creekside wirelettuce or Teton wirelettuce.

References

fluminea
Flora of Wyoming